Mesenteric plexus may refer to:
Superior mesenteric plexus
Intermesenteric plexus
Inferior mesenteric plexus